1st Chaplygina or Pervaya Chaplygina is a rural locality in Rusanovsky Selsoviet Rural Settlement, Fatezhsky District, Kursk Oblast, Russia. Population:

Geography 
The village is located on the right bank of the Usozha River (a left tributary of the Svapa in the basin of the Seym), 103 km from the Russia–Ukraine border, 45 km north-west of Kursk, from the south-west is adjacent to the district center – the town Fatezh, 1 km from the selsoviet center – Basovka. There are no streets with titles.

 Climate
1st Chaplygina has a warm-summer humid continental climate (Dfb in the Köppen climate classification).

Transport 
1st Chaplygina is located 1.5 km from the federal route  Crimea Highway as part of the European route E105, 1 km from the road of regional importance  (Fatezh – Dmitriyev), 1 km from the road of intermunicipal significance  (38K-038 – Basovka), 31.5 km from the nearest railway station Vozy (railway line Oryol – Kursk).

The rural locality is situated 47 km from Kursk Vostochny Airport, 167 km from Belgorod International Airport and 234 km from Voronezh Peter the Great Airport.

References

Notes

Sources

Rural localities in Fatezhsky District